The Stratford Professional was a non-ranking snooker tournament staged on three occasions from 1970–1972. 

The first tournament, played on 4 September 1970, was won by Gary Owen, who defeated Ray Reardon 6–4. Owen top scored with a break of 66 while Reardon had a high break of 54. The following year featured two different finalists, with John Spencer defeating David Taylor 5–2 at Wilmcote Men's Club. Spencer also had the highest break of the match with 91. The third edition took place the following year at Wootton Wawen Social Club, with Spencer attempting to defend his title against Alex Higgins. Although Spencer made the highest break of 77, Higgins won 6–3.

Winners

References

Snooker non-ranking competitions
Recurring sporting events established in 1970
Recurring events disestablished in 1972
Defunct snooker competitions